ABBA: The Movie is a 1977 mockumentary comedy-drama film about the Swedish pop group ABBA's Australian tour. An international co-production from Sweden and Australia, the film was directed by Lasse Hallström, who helmed most of the band's videos. Its release coincided with ABBA: The Album, the group's fifth studio album, and features many songs from that album as well as many of their earlier hits, and one, "Get on the Carousel", unavailable anywhere else.

Theatrically released in December 1977 in Sweden and Australia, it made its way overseas throughout 1978–79. The film was a box office success and received positive reviews from critics, and has further developed a cult following among ABBA fans.

Plot
The film concerns the adventures of Ashley Wallace (Robert Hughes), a naïve DJ on Radio 2TW, who normally presents a through-the-night country and western-themed show. In spite of this, he is sent by the station's boss (Bruce Barry) to get an in-depth interview ("Not an interview, a dialogue", demands his boss) with the group, which is to be aired on the day ABBA leave Australia. Ashley, who has never done an interview before, fails, mainly because he has forgotten to pack his press card, although the fact that he is unable to buy a concert ticket doesn't help matters. Armed with his trusty reel-to-reel tape recorder, Ashley is forced to follow the group all over Australia, beginning in Sydney, and then travelling, in order, to Perth, Adelaide, and Melbourne, experiencing repeated run-ins with the group's very protective bodyguard (Tom Oliver), as well as his increasingly exasperated boss. Throughout the movie, we see Ashley interviewing members of the public, asking them if and why they like ABBA.  Almost all the comments are positive, but one man is driven mad by his ABBA-obsessed twelve-year-old son, and another girl thinks ABBA are over the top.

Eventually, Ashley has a lucky chance encounter with Stig Anderson, the group's manager, in the foyer of ABBA's hotel, who agrees to arrange an interview, and gives him tickets to that evening's concert. But Ashley sleeps in and misses the interview time. Just as he has given up hope, he finds himself face-to-face with ABBA in an elevator. They give him an interview there and then, and he leaves Melbourne just in time to meet the deadline for the radio show to go on-air. He puts together the final edit in the back of a taxi from the airport, as ABBA depart Australia for Europe. With only minutes to go, Ashley makes it back to the radio station where, having set the tape up on the studio's playback machine, he relaxes at his control desk to listen as the interview is broadcast.

Cast
 Benny Andersson as himself
 Björn Ulvaeus as himself
 Agnetha Fältskog as herself
 Anni-Frid Lyngstad as herself
 Stig Anderson as himself
 Richard Norton as himself, bodyguard and fitness trainer (uncredited)
 Robert Hughes as Ashley Wallace
 Bruce Barry as radio station manager
 Tom Oliver as bodyguard/bartender/taxi driver

Music
 The introductory bars of "Hole in Your Soul" accompany the opening credits, but the song itself does not feature further.
 "Tiger"
 "S.O.S."
 "Money, Money, Money"
 "He Is Your Brother"
 "Intermezzo No. 1"
 "Waterloo"
 "Mamma Mia"
 "Rock Me"
 "I've Been Waiting for You"
 "The Name of the Game"
 "Why Did It Have to Be Me?"
 "When I Kissed the Teacher"
 "Get on the Carousel"
 "I'm a Marionette"
 "Fernando"
 "Dancing Queen"
 "So Long"
 "Eagle"
 "Thank You for the Music"

A brief snatch of "Knowing Me, Knowing You" as well as "Dum Dum Diddle" is also heard while Ashley is stuck in a traffic jam; they're presumably coming from a nearby car radio.

"Ring Ring" is performed by the members of a girls' ballet class Ashley speaks to for the interview while they are practicing their routines (the ABBA version can be heard in the background, which the children are singing along to).

Other tracks include "Johan på Snippen" ("Johan Snippen") and "Polkan går" ("Polka goes"), both Swedish traditional songs played by Andersson on piano accordion, and the instrumental "Stoned".

The country/western track heard towards the beginning when Ashley is in the radio studio is an early 1970s Björn & Benny song, "Please Change Your Mind", performed by Nashville Train. The song was also recorded by this Swedish country band (several of the musicians are from ABBA's own studio band) and released on their 1977 album ABBA Our Way.

Production
Hallström indicated that the film's script and plot concept was "conceived on the plane on the way to Australia". Initially, 16 mm film was to be used but producers upgraded the project to 35 mm Panavision technology.

Mostly filmed in Australia some additional scenes were filmed in ABBA's native Sweden (but still set in Australia)—noticeably different from Australia.

Reception
Margaret Geddes of Australian newspaper The Age concluded that the film was "slick, competent and even for the non-convert entertaining."

Release
ABBA: The Movie was first released in December 1977. The film was presented in several Eastern Bloc nations, including the Soviet Union where it was screened at two movie houses in Moscow. The film went on wide release in the USSR in 1982, where it became one of the hits of the year, gathering an audience of 33.2 million viewers.

Home media
To date four releases of the film have been made: a single-disc DVD, a two-disc, special-edition DVD, a single-disc Blu-ray, and a now-defunct single-disc HD DVD. All releases above feature a restored print with bonus material. The initial DVD, including digital restoration, was released by SBS in Australia on 2 October 2005.

Re-releases
A theatrical re-release occurred across Europe during July and August 2008 (the same period as the ABBA-themed movie musical Mamma Mia! first hit American theaters) in the UK, Ireland, the Netherlands, Norway, Germany and Austria.

On 12 and 14 May 2022, the film saw a theatrical re-release for the group's 50th anniversary. It was its first wide release in North America.

References

External links
 
 
 
 
 
 
 ABBA: The Movie at Oz Movies

ABBA
1977 films
1977 documentary films
Warner Bros. films
Australian documentary films
Swedish documentary films
1970s English-language films
English-language Swedish films
1970s Swedish-language films
Films directed by Lasse Hallström
Documentary films about musical groups
Films shot in Sweden
Films set in Australia
1977 multilingual films
Australian multilingual films
Swedish multilingual films
1970s Swedish films